Tropidophorus latiscutatus is a species of skink found in Thailand.

References

latiscutatus
Reptiles of Thailand
Reptiles described in 2002
Taxa named by Tsutomu Hikida
Taxa named by Nikolai Loutseranovitch Orlov
Taxa named by Hidetoshi Ota